Matthew Thompson is an American-born Australian writer. He has written a number of books, including Mayhem: The Strange and Savage Saga of Christopher 'Badness' Binse, My Colombian Death and Running with the Blood God.

References

External links
 Official homepage
 Twitter
 Facebook

Year of birth missing (living people)
Living people
Australian writers